Lars Sørensen (born January 3, 1968, in Holstebro, Midtjylland, Denmark) was Danish swimmer who competed in the 1988 Olympics and 1992 Olympics.

References

1968 births
Danish male backstroke swimmers
Danish male breaststroke swimmers
Danish male medley swimmers
Olympic swimmers of Denmark
Swimmers at the 1988 Summer Olympics
Swimmers at the 1992 Summer Olympics
Living people
European Aquatics Championships medalists in swimming
People from Holstebro
Sportspeople from the Central Denmark Region